Brenda Giselle Castro Madrigal (born July 25, 1992 in Guápiles, Limón, Costa Rica) is a Costa Rican model and beauty pageant titleholder who was crowned Miss Costa Rica 2015 and represented her country at the Miss Universe 2015 pageant. she also will represent Costa Rica at Miss Grand International 2019 in Caracas.

Personal life
Brenda was born in Guápiles, Limón Province. Brenda started modeling at age 15. Before winning the Miss Costa Rica, she had previously won Señorita Expo-Pococí 2008, Miss Teenager Costa Rica 2011, Miss Latinoamérica Costa Rica 2014 and Señorita Verano Costa Rica 2015. She also had international placements as 2nd Runner-up Miss Teenager International 2011 and 3rd Runner-up Miss Latinoamerica International 2014.

Miss Costa Rica 2015
Brenda was crowned Miss Costa Rica by Miss Universe Costa Rica 2014,Karina Ramos. Brenda was representing Limon at the pageant held in La Sabana and broadcast on Teletica. As Miss Costa Rica, she competed at the Miss Universe 2015 pageant on December 20, 2015, but didn't receive a placement.

References

External links

Living people
Miss Universe 2015 contestants
Costa Rican beauty pageant winners
1992 births
People from Limón Province